The Civilian Repair Organisation (CRO) was a branch of the British Air Ministry (later, of the Ministry of Aircraft Production), formed in 1939 to co-ordinate maintenance and repairs of military aircraft by civilian firms.

It should not be confused with the Civil Repair Organisation, which carried out similar functions for the UK Air Ministry in India between 1943 and 1945.

Background
Following the outbreak of World War II, on 11 September 1939 the No.1 Civilian Repair Unit (CRU) was established at the Cowley works of Morris Motors, to be staffed by civilians under the management of the Air Ministry. On 6 October 1939, Sir Kingsley Wood (the Secretary of State for Air) officially appointed William Morris (Lord Nuffield) as Director General (Maintenance), to organise and manage the Civilian Repair Organisation (CRO), to control the CRU and participating civilian firms. Nuffield, as the head of Morris Motors, had been in charge of the shadow factory for aircraft production at Castle Bromwich. 

CRO administration was established at Magdalen College, Oxford. On 14 May 1940, supervision of the CRO was transferred from the Air Ministry to the newly formed Ministry of Aircraft Production, under Lord Beaverbrook. The No.1 CRU was supplemented by the No.1 Metal and Produce Recovery Depot (MPRD), established adjacent to the existing Cowley works. At Cowley, a support unit was established in the form of No.50 Maintenance Unit (MU), to transport damaged aircraft and parts to the CRU and to firms participating in the CRO, and also to collect non-repairable parts and scrap for materials reclamation at MPRD. Individual Maintenance Units came under the control of No.43 Group, RAF Maintenance Command.

The civilian firms under individual contracts from the CRO were mostly existing companies engaged in the production, maintenance, repair and operation of aircraft in the UK. Those were supplemented by additional companies in the engineering and woodworking industrial sectors. Repairs to whole aircraft or parts of aircraft were often carried out in dispersed industrial factories, then transported to airfields for re-assembly and test flying, before re-delivery to RAF units. For cases of minor repairs that could be achieved quickly, aircraft could be flown to a CRO firm based at an airfield, repaired, and flown out the following day by the same pilot; these were known as "Fly In" repairs.

List of firms participating in the CRO
Principal ref: Sturtivant 2007

Summary of operations
In the period May 1940 to July 1945, CRO had returned a total of 79,000 aircraft to the flight line. At that point, of all the heavy aircraft then flying in the RAF, 36.5% (3,285) had been processed through CRO. Activities continued for several years after the end of World War II.

Notes

Bibliography
Postan, M.M. 1952. History of the Second World War - British War Production. HMSO
Sturtivant, Ray and Hamlin, John. 2007. RAF Flying Training and Support Units. Air-Britain 
Wright, Peter. "From Scraps to Scrap", Aeromilitaria, December 2010

Aviation organisations based in the United Kingdom
Air Ministry during World War II
1939 establishments in the United Kingdom
Organizations established in 1939